Shortcuts (formerly Workflow) is a visual scripting application developed by Apple and provided on its iOS, iPadOS, macOS, and watchOS operating systems. It allows users to create macros for executing specific tasks on their device(s). These task sequences can be created by the user and shared online through iCloud. A number of curated shortcuts can also be downloaded from the integrated Gallery.

Shortcuts are activated manually through the app, shortcut widgets, the share sheet, and Siri. They can also be automated to trigger after an event, such as the time of day, leaving a set location, or opening an app.

Shortcuts was originally created by DeskConnect, Inc. (Ari Weinstein, Conrad Kramer, Veeral Patel, and Nick Frey) for MHacks Winter 2014 competition and was awarded first place for Best iOS App.

History
Workflow originally began as a project at The University of Michigan's MHacks.

In 2015, Workflow received an Apple Design Award for its integration with iOS accessibility features such as VoiceOver.

On March 22, 2017, Apple acquired Workflow for an undisclosed amount. Following the purchase, the software was made available for free. An accompanying update also changed some of the service providers used within the app to those owned or preferred by Apple, such as Apple Maps and Microsoft Translator, and closed submissions of workflows to Gallery.

On September 17, 2018, the Workflow app became the Shortcuts app, which runs shortcuts with Siri, along with iOS 12. The app was announced on June 4, 2018, at WWDC 2018.

On September 19, 2019, with the public launch of iOS 13, the Shortcuts app became a default app installed on all iOS 13 devices.

On June 7, 2021, at WWDC 2021, a desktop version of the Shortcuts app was announced for macOS.

On September 12, 2022 Apple launched an update to the Shortcuts app as a part of iOS 16. This update included the ability to integrate Siri voice assistant with Shortcuts.

URL scheme

Shortcuts also supports a URL scheme. This works as follows:
 shortcuts://opens the app.
 shortcuts://galleryopens the gallery with shortcuts
shortcuts://gallery/search?query=[search words] searches the gallery for the search word. URL encoding is required to use multiple search words.
shortcuts://create-shortcutcreates a new shortcut.
shortcuts://open-shortcut?name=[name]opens searches for and opens the shortcut. Spaces are filled in with %20.
shortcuts://run-shortcut?name=[name]&input=[see note]&text=[see note]executes a shortcutNote: The parameters "input" and "text" are optional. If you pass "clipboard" to input, the clipboard is passed as input. If you pass "text" to input, the parameter "text" is retrieved and the text stored there is passed as input. There, spaces must be replaced by %20.

See also 
 AppleScript
 Automator

References

External links 
 Workflow Website & Documentation

Automation software
Apple Inc. acquisitions
IOS software
macOS

IOS-based software made by Apple Inc.